Josiah Burr Plumb (25 March 1816 – 12 March 1888) was an American-born Canadian businessman and parliamentarian.  Born in East Haven, Connecticut, Plumb immigrated to Canada in 1865 and settled near Niagara Falls, Ontario.
  
Soon thereafter he became active in the Conservative Party of Canada.  He was elected three times as a member of parliament for Niagara in the House of Commons of Canada. He was first elected in the Canadian federal election of 1874, but this result was voided, although he successfully defended the seat in a by-election held on 22 December 1874. Although defeated in the 1878 election, he regained his seat in a contested election in 1879.

Following a defeat in 1882 election, he was appointed to the Senate of Canada on 8 February 1883 on the recommendation of Sir John A. Macdonald. He served as Speaker of the Senate from 4 April 1887 – 12 March 1888, upon his death.

References 
Biography at the Dictionary of Canadian Biography Online

1816 births
1888 deaths
Speakers of the Senate of Canada
Canadian senators from Ontario
Members of the House of Commons of Canada from Ontario
Conservative Party of Canada (1867–1942) MPs
American emigrants to pre-Confederation Ontario
Immigrants to the Province of Canada
People from East Haven, Connecticut